The 2008 Florida Gators baseball team represented the University of Florida in the sport of baseball during the 2008 college baseball season. The Gators competed in Division I of the National Collegiate Athletic Association (NCAA) and the Eastern Division of the Southeastern Conference (SEC). They played their home games at Alfred A. McKethan Stadium, on the university's Gainesville, Florida campus. The team was the first at Florida coached by Kevin O'Sullivan.

Roster

Schedule 

! style="background:#FF4A00;color:white;"| Regular season
|- valign="top" 

|- align="center" bgcolor="ddffdd"
| February 22 ||  ||
| McKethan Stadium ||10–7||Bullock (1–0)
|Hassett (0–1)
|None
|3,408
| 1–0 || –
|- align="center" bgcolor="ddffdd"
| February 23 || Siena ||
| McKethan Stadium ||4–0||Keating (1–0)
|Moberg (0–1)
|None
|2,857
| 2–0 || –
|- align="center" bgcolor="ddffdd"
| February 24 || Siena ||
| McKethan Stadium ||13–6||Toledo (1–0)
|Marcellus (0–1)
|None
|2,823
| 3–0 || –
|- align="center" bgcolor="ddffdd"
| February 27 ||  ||
|McKethan Stadium
|15–2||Locke (1–0)
|Wendzicki (0–1)
|None
|–
| 4–0 || –
|- align="center" bgcolor="ddffdd"
| February 27 || Eastern Michigan ||
| McKethan Stadium ||16–8||LaCoste (1–0)
|Goldschmidt (0–1)
|None
|2,363
| 5–0 || –
|- align="center" bgcolor="ffdddd"
| February 29 || at No. 14 Miami (FL)Rivalry||
| Mark Light StadiumCoral Gables, FL ||4–8||Erickson (2–0)
|Mullaney (0–1)
|None
|3,000
| 5–1 || –
|-

|- align="center" bgcolor="ffdddd"
| March 1 ||at No. 14 Miami (FL)Rivalry||||Mark Light Stadium||5–8||Santana (1–0)||Bullock (1–1)||Gutierrez (3)||3,000||5–2||–
|- align="center" bgcolor="ddffdd"
| March 2 ||at No. 14 Miami (FL)Rivalry||||Mark Light Stadium
|6–2||Franklin (1–0)||Koronis (0–1)||None||3,000||6–2
|–
|- align="center" bgcolor="ddffdd"
| March 4 |||||| McKethan Stadium ||15–3||Edmondson (1–0)||Raisch (0–1)||None||2,293||7–2
|–
|- align="center" bgcolor="ddffdd"
| March 5 ||Campbell|||| McKethan Stadium ||15–0||Lawler (1–0)||Fish (0–1)||None||2,341||8–2
|–
|- align="center" bgcolor="ffdddd"
| March 8 |||||| McKethan Stadium ||2–11||Weidig (1–1)||Bullock (1–2)||None||–||8–3
|–
|- align="center" bgcolor="ddffdd"
| March 8 ||Brown|||| McKethan Stadium ||8–7||Franklin (2–0)||Hallberg (0–1)||None||2,778||9–3
|–
|- align="center" bgcolor="ddffdd"
| March 9 ||Brown||||McKethan Stadium
|13–2||Toledo (2–0)||Kimball (0–1)||None||2,704||10–3
|–
|- align="center" bgcolor="ddffdd"
| March 11 ||||||McKethan Stadium
|2–1||Edmondson (2–0)||Woodworth (2–1)||None||2,539||11–3
|–
|- align="center" bgcolor="ddffdd"
| March 14 ||||||McKethan Stadium
|7–1||Bullock (2–2)||Dayton (1–1)||None||2,477||12–3
|1–0
|- align="center" bgcolor="ddffdd"
| March 15 ||Auburn|||| McKethan Stadium ||12–8||Keating (2–0)||Shuman (2–1)||Mullaney (1)||3,043||13–3
|2–0
|- align="center" bgcolor="ddffdd"
| March 16 ||Auburn||||McKethan Stadium
|6–2||Toledo (3–0)||Luckie (2–2)||Franklin (1)||3,298||14–3
|3–0
|- align="center" bgcolor="ddffdd"
| March 18 ||No. 3 Florida StateRivalry|||| McKethan Stadium ||6–1||Locke (2–0)||O'Dell (1–1)||Mullaney (2)||5,719||15–3
|–
|- align="center" bgcolor="ffdddd"
| March 21 ||at No. 18 ||||Swayze FieldOxford, MS
|4–5||McKean (2–0)||Franklin (2–1)||None||5,075||15–4
|3–1
|- align="center" bgcolor="ddffdd"
| March 22 ||at No. 18 Ole Miss||||Swayze Field
|6–4||Keating (3–0)||Satterwhite (2–1)||Mullaney (3)||5,228||16–4
|4–1
|- align="center" bgcolor="ddffdd"
| March 23 ||at No. 18 Ole Miss||||Swayze Field
|10–2||Toledo (4–0)||Baker (1–3)||None||4,163||17–4
|5–1
|- align="center" bgcolor="ddffdd"
| March 25 ||||No. 22||McKethan Stadium
|11–6||Franklin (3–1)||Green (1–1)||None||2,755||18–4
|–
|- align="center" bgcolor="ffdddd"
| March 26 ||at Jacksonville||No. 22||Sessions StadiumJacksonville, FL||5–8||Davis (1–1)||Mullaney (0–2)||Brown (1)||2,312||18–5
|–
|- align="center" bgcolor="ddffdd"
| March 28 ||LSU||No. 22||McKethan Stadium||8–5||Bullock (3–2)||Bradford (4–3)||Edmondson (1)||4,531||19–5
|6–1
|- align="center" bgcolor="ddffdd"
| March 29 ||LSU||No. 22|| McKethan Stadium ||7–1||Keating (4–0)||Verdugo (4–2)||None||4,015||20–5
|7–1
|- align="center" bgcolor="ffdddd"
| March 30 ||LSU||No. 22|| McKethan Stadium ||3–6||Bradford (5–3)||Toledo (4–1)||None||3,290||20–6||7–2
|-

|- align="center" bgcolor="ffdddd"
| April 1 ||vs. No. 2 Florida StateRivalry||No. 17||Baseball GroundsJacksonville, FL
|2–10||Strauss (3–0)||Locke (2–1)||None||7,215||20–7||–
|- align="center" bgcolor="ffdddd"
| April 2 ||||No. 17||McKethan Stadium||10-1110||Pryor (3–3)||Franklin (3–2)||Stohr (7)||2,943||20–8||–
|- align="center" bgcolor="ffdddd"
| April 5 ||at ||No. 17||Knoxville, TN
|4–5||Hernandez (1–1)||Edmondson (2–1)||Wiltz (3)||–||20–9||7–3
|- align="center" bgcolor="ffdddd"
| April 5 ||at Tennessee||No. 17||||6–12||Rosas (2–1)||Toledo (4–2)||None||2,548||20–10||7–4
|- align="center" bgcolor="ddffdd"
| April 6 ||at Tennessee||No. 17||||7–27||Keating (5–0)||Crnkovich (4–3)||Locke (1)||2,775||21–10||8–4
|- align="center" bgcolor="ddffdd"
| April 8 ||North Florida||No. 24||McKethan Stadium
|5–3
|Edmondson (3–1)||Pryor (3–2)||None||3,153||22–10||–
|- align="center" bgcolor="ddffdd"
| April 9 ||North Florida||No. 24||McKethan Stadium||3–2||Lawler (2–0)||Turner (0–2)||Franklin (2)||2,617||23–10
|–
|- align="center" bgcolor="ffdddd"
| April 11 ||||No. 24||McKethan Stadium
|1–2||Keuchel (3–1)||Edmondson (3–2)||Richards (2)||3,523||23–11
|8–5
|- align="center" bgcolor="ddffdd"
| April 12 ||Arkansas||No. 24||McKethan Stadium
|6–1||Keating (6–0)||Springston (4–2)||Locke (2)||3,525||24–11
|9–5
|- align="center" bgcolor="ffdddd"
| April 13 ||Arkansas||No. 24||McKethan Stadium||4–10||Wells (3–0)||Toledo (4–3)||None||3,113||24–12
|9–6
|- align="center" bgcolor="ffdddd"
| April 15 ||at No. 1 Florida StateRivalry||||Dick Howser StadiumTallahassee, FL
|2–4||Strauss (5–0)||Mullaney (0–3)||None||6,737||24–13||–
|- align="center" bgcolor="ffdddd"
| April 18 ||at No. 23 Kentucky||||Cliff Hagan StadiumLexington, KY
|7–11||Albers (6–1)||Locke (2–2)||None||3,036||24–14||9–7
|- align="center" bgcolor="ddffdd"
| April 19 ||at No. 23 Kentucky||||Cliff Hagan Stadium||13–7
|Keating (7–0)||Paxton (3–2)||None||2,703||25–14||10–7
|- align="center" bgcolor="ffdddd"
| April 20 ||at No. 23 Kentucky||||Cliff Hagan Stadium
|2–310||Green (4–2)||Toledo (4–4)||None||2,499
|25–15
|10–8
|- align="center" bgcolor="ffdddd"
| April 25 ||No. 5 Georgia|||| McKethan Stadium ||4–7
|Holder (6–2)||Bullock (3–3)||Fields (12)||3,687||25–16
|10–9
|- align="center" bgcolor="ddffdd"
| April 26 ||No. 5 Georgia|||| McKethan Stadium ||7–2||Locke (3–2)||Dodson (5–2)||None||3,343||26–16
|11–9
|- align="center" bgcolor="ddffdd"
| April 27 ||No. 5 Georgia|||| McKethan Stadium ||7–2||Keating (8–0)||Moreau (1–2)||Edmondson (2)||3,271||27–16
|12–9
|-

|- align="center" bgcolor="ddffdd"
| May 2 ||||No. 22||Sarge Frye FieldColumbia, SC
|9–3
|Bullock (4–3)||Cisco (5–3)||None||4,861||28–16
|13–9
|- align="center" bgcolor="ffdddd"
| May 3 ||||No. 22||Sarge Frye Field||5–6||Atwood (5–2)||Edmondson (3–3)||None||5,136||28–17
|13–10
|- align="center" bgcolor="ffdddd"
| May 4 ||||No. 22||Sarge Frye Field||6–9||Godwin (5–2)||Mullaney (0–4)||Bangs (2)||4,904||28–18
|13–11
|- align="center" bgcolor="ddffdd"
| May 7 ||||No. 22||McKethan Stadium||11-10||Mullaney (1–4)||Chapman (2–3)||None||2,762||29–18
|–
|- align="center" bgcolor="ffdddd"
| May 9 ||at ||No. 22||Tuscaloosa, AL
|6–7||Graham (4–1)||Davis (0–1)||None||4,699||29–19
|13–12
|- align="center" bgcolor="ddffdd"
| May 10 ||at Alabama||No. 22||||6–2||Locke (4–2)||Hyatt (3–4)||None||4,545||30–19
|14–13
|- align="center" bgcolor="ffdddd"
| May 11 ||at Alabama||No. 22||||7–8||Graham (5–1)||Franklin (3–3)||None||4,204||30–20
|14–13
|- align="center" bgcolor="ddffdd"
| May 13 ||||||McKethan Stadium||12–2||Mullaney (2–4)||Kaufman (3–3)||None||2,668||31–20
|–
|- align="center" bgcolor="ddffdd"
| May 15 ||No. 17 Vanderbilt|||| McKethan Stadium ||8–6||Edmondson (4–3)||Brewer (4–2)||None||2,656||32–20
|15–13
|- align="center" bgcolor="ddffdd"
| May 16 ||No. 17 Vanderbilt|||| McKethan Stadium ||5–4||Locke (5–2)||Cotham (7–4)||Keating (1)||2,863||33–20
|16–13
|- align="center" bgcolor="ddffdd"
| May 17 ||No. 17 Vanderbilt||||McKethan Stadium
|13-1211||Mullaney (3–4)||Jacobson (1–4)||None||2,877||34–20
|17–13
|-

|-
! style="background:#FF4A00;color:white;"| Post-season
|-

|- align="center" bgcolor="ffdddd"
| May 21 || vs. Vanderbilt ||No. 17|| Regions ParkHoover, AL || 3–7 ||Minor (6–3)||Keating (8–1)||Brewer (6)||6,027||34–21||0–1
|- align="center" bgcolor="ffdddd"
| May 22 ||  ||No. 17|| Regions Park || 3–11 ||Godwin (7–3)||Bullock (4–4)||Cisco (1)||5,894||34–22||0–2
|-

|- align="center" bgcolor="ffdddd"
| May 29 ||vs. |||| Dick Howser Stadium || 4–7 ||Pepitone (4–1)||Bullock (4–5)||Segedin (5)||3,609||34–23||0–1
|- align="center" bgcolor="ffdddd"
|May 30||at No. 3 Florida State|||| Dick Howser Stadium || 11-17 ||Villanueva (7–2)||Davis (0–2)||None||4,442||34–24||0–2
|-

Rankings from Collegiate Baseball. All times Eastern. Retrieved from FloridaGators.com

See also 
 Florida Gators
 List of Florida Gators baseball players

References

External links 
 Gator Baseball official website

Florida Gators baseball seasons
Florida Gators baseball team
Florida Gators
Florida